Hedmark was a county in Norway before 1 January 2020, bordering Trøndelag to the north, Oppland to the west, Akershus to the south, and Sweden to the east. The county administration is in Hamar.

Hedmark and Oppland counties were merged into Innlandet county on 1 January 2020, when Norway's former 19 counties became 10 bigger counties / regions

Hedmark made up the northeastern part of Østlandet, the southeastern part of the country. It had a long border with Sweden to the east (Dalarna County and Värmland County). The largest lakes were Femunden and Mjøsa, the largest lake in Norway. Parts of Glomma, Norway's longest river, flowed through Hedmark. Geographically,

Hedmark was traditionally divided into: Hedemarken (east of the lake Mjøsa), Østerdalen ("East Valley" north of the town Elverum), and Solør / Glåmdalen (south of Elverum) and Odal in the very south. Hedmark and Oppland were the only Norwegian counties with no coastline. Hedmark also hosted some events of the 1994 Winter Olympic Games.

Hamar, Kongsvinger, Elverum and Tynset were cities in the county. Hedmark was one of the less urbanized areas in Norway; about half of the inhabitants lived on rural land. The population was mainly concentrated in the rich agricultural district adjoining Mjøsa to the southeast. The county's extensive forests supplied much of Norway's timber; at one time, logs were floated down Glomma to the coast but are now transported by truck and train.

The Hedmark municipality of Engerdal had the distinction of marking the current southernmost border in Norway of Sápmi, the traditional region of the Sami people.

The county was divided into three traditional districts. Those were Hedmarken, Østerdalen and Solør (with Odalen and Vinger).

Hedmark was originally a part of the large Akershus amt, but in 1757 Oplandenes amt was separated from it. Some years later, in 1781, this was divided into Kristians amt (now Oppland) and Hedemarkens amt. Until 1919, the county was called Hedemarkens amt.

Etymology
The Old Norse form of the name was Heiðmǫrk. The first element is heiðnir, the name of an old Germanic tribe and is related to the word heið, which means moorland. The last element is mǫrk 'woodland, borderland, march'. (See also Telemark and Finnmark.)

Coat of arms
The coat of arms is from modern times (1987). It shows three barkespader (adzes used to remove bark from timber logs).

Politics
Every four years the inhabitants of Hedmark elected 33 representatives to the Hedmark Fylkesting, the Hedmark County Assembly. After the elections of September 2007, the majority of the seats of the assembly were held by a three-party coalition consisting of the Labour Party (14 seats), the Centre Party (5 seats) and the Socialist Left Party (2 seats). Eight parties were represented in the assembly, the remaining 5 being the Progress Party (4 seats), the Conservative Party (4), the Liberal Party (2), the Christian Democratic Party (1) and the Pensioners Party (1). The assembly was headed by the county mayor (Norwegian: Fylkesordfører). From 2007 to 2011, the county mayor was Arnfinn Nergård, representing the Centre Party. In 2003, a parliamentary system was established, which meant that the county assembly elected a political administration or council to hold executive power. This county council reflected the majority of the county assembly and included the three parties holding the majority of the assembly seats, i.e., the Labour Party, the Center Party and the Socialist Left Party. The council was led by Siv Tørudbakken, a member of the Labour Party.

Municipalities

Districts

 Glåmdal
 Hedmarken
 Østerdalen
 Solør
 Vinger

Cities

 Hamar
 Kongsvinger
 Brumunddal
 Elverum

Parishes

 Alvdal
 Austmarka (Østmark)
 Brandval
 Brøttum
 Deset
 Drevsjø (Drevsjøhytte)
 Eidskog
 Elverum
 Engerdal
 Finnskog
 Folldal
 Furnes
 Gjesås
 Grue
 Hamar
 Helgøy Kapell
 Hof
 Innset
 Kongsvinger
 Kvikne
 Lundersæter
 Løten
 Mo
 Nes
 Nord-Odal
 Nordre-Osen
 Opstad
 Os (Dalsbygda)
 Ottestad
 Rendal
 Rendalen
 Revholt
 Ringsaker
 Romedal
 Sand
 Sollia
 Stange
 Stavsjø (Ballishol)
 Stor Elvdal
 Strand
 Strøm
 Sør-Odal
 Sør Osen
 Tangen
 Tolga
 Trysil
 Tylldal
 Tynset
 Ulleren
 Vallset (Tomter)
 Vang
 Veldre
 Vestmarka
 Vingelen
 Vinger
 Våler
 Ytre Rendal
 Øvre Engerdal
 Øvre Rendal
 Åmot
 Åsnes
 Odalen Branch (LDS, 1857-1873)
 Trysil Frimenighet, (1859-1891)

Villages

 Atna
 Bergesida
 Bergset
 Braskereidfoss
 Brumunddal
 Disenå
 Drevsjø
 Espa
 Flisa
 Furnes
 Fådalen
 Fåset
 Galterud
 Grinder
 Hanestad
 Hekne
 Heimdal
 Heradsbygd
 Hjellum
 Hodalen
 Ilseng
 Ingeberg
 Innbygda
 Kirkenær
 Kjellmyra
 Knapper
 Koppang
 Kvål
 Kylstad
 Lundersæter
 Magnor
 Matrand
 Mesnali
 Mo (Gardvik)
 Moelv
 Namnå
 Nybergsund
 Os i Østerdalen
 Otnes
 Ottestad
 Plassmoen
 Rena
 Ridabu
 Risberget
 Rotberget
 Roverud
 Rudshøgda
 Sand (Sagstua)
 Sander
 Sandvika
 Sinnerud
 Sjølisand
 Skarnes
 Skasenden
 Skotterud
 Slettmoen
 Sorken
 Starhellinga
 Svullrya
 Tangen
 Telneset
 Tylldalen
 Tørberget
 Unset
 Vangsås/Slemsrud
 Våler
 Østby
 Øversjødalen
 Åbogen
 Ådalsbruk
 Åkre
 Åkrestrømmen
 Åsta

Former municipalities

 Brandval
 Furnes
 Hof
 Kvikne
 Nes
 Rendal
 Romedal
 Sollia
 Tolga-Os
 Vang
 Vinger
 Ytre Rendal
 Øvre Rendal
 Åsnes og Våler

References

External links 
 
 
 Official homepage 

 
Former counties of Norway
History of Innlandet
2020 disestablishments in Norway
Petty kingdoms of Norway
States and territories disestablished in 2020